Sheila Mary Denning (1920–2015) was a British painter.

Early life 
Sheila Mary Denning was born in West Sussex to an English mother and Irish GP father. After a sheltered rural childhood spent mostly in Gloucestershire and Wiltshire and two years at Westonbirt School, she studied at the Westminster School of Art from 1938-1939. Her father, who disapproved of her decision to become a painter, withdrew funding mid-way through the year. Sheila’s photographer uncle John French suggested she work as a photographic fashion model, making use of her six foot height and stunning good looks. He helped her find work and she was able to continue her studies part time until the outbreak of World War II.

War service 
Denning spent five years in the army where she worked as a chauffeur and driving instructor before becoming an officer with the Army Education Corps, organizing cultural events. By 1944 she was moving in Quaker circles. Appalled by the bombing of Dresden, she applied for exemption from military service as a conscientious objector and left the army in spring 1945.

Training 
Denning resumed her painting studies after the war. She did this first at Heatherley School of Fine Art from 1946 to 1947 and subsequently at Camberwell School of Arts and Crafts from 1947 to 1950, where she was taught by William Coldstream and Victor Pasmore, and by Martin Bloch. Denning found the rigorous realist techniques taught at Camberwell under the influence of Coldstream of limited value and gained more from the tuition of Bloch, a German Jewish refugee who had travelled throughout Europe meeting and working with a wide range of artists. His approach showed the influence of German expressionism and he had a ‘masterful understanding of how colour and light affected atmosphere’. After leaving Camberwell, Denning studied pottery part-time at Farnham School of Art.

Pottery 
From 1952 to 1959, Denning jointly set up and ran Hawkley Pottery in Eastcombe, Gloucestershire, with Thornhill, although he was the dominant partner and she was never enthusiastic about pottery.

Painting career 

From 1946 to 1994, Denning worked primarily as a portrait painter and she became a member of the Contemporary Portrait Society in the mid 1960s. She also painted landscapes and still life. She worked in oils, drew in pencil and made prints. In the 1960s she worked for a short period as an art therapist. Denning taught painting for many years at adult education institutes in West Sussex, at Brighton Technical College and occasionally at Heatherleys School of Art, as well as running private courses in portraiture and landscape from her home in Chichester.

Exhibitions

Solo exhibitions 
 Clarendon Gallery, London, 1985
 Eastgate Gallery, Chichester, 1987
 Pallant House Garden Gallery, Chichester, 1996

Mixed exhibitions 
 Contemporary Portrait Society
 Royal Society of Portrait Painters
 Royal Society of British Artists
 Pastel Society
 Society of Graphic Artists
 University of London Institute of Education
 Ashgate and New Ashgate Gallery, Farnham
 David Paul Gallery, Chichester
 Portsmouth City Museum Biennale, 1992
 York Street Gallery, Bath
 Sussex Open, Brighton, 1995, 1998
 Discerning Eye Exhibition, Mall Galleries, London 1997
 Chichester Festivities Exhibition, “Space and Light”, 1999
 Bradford on Avon Arts Festival, 2007, 2008

References

1920 births
2015 deaths
20th-century English women artists
21st-century English women artists
Alumni of Camberwell College of Arts
Alumni of the Heatherley School of Fine Art
Alumni of the University of Westminster 
British Army personnel of World War II
English women painters
People educated at Westonbirt School
People from West Sussex